Nicholas Richard Fry (born 29 June 1956 in the United Kingdom) is the former Chief Executive Officer of the Mercedes AMG Petronas Formula One Team, having previously served in similar roles at previous incarnations of the company.

His career in motoring started with the Ford Motor Company in 1977, as a graduate trainee from the University of Wales with a degree in Economics. Working first in Sales and then Market Research, in 1978, he was moved to Product Development as Product Planner. He helped develop a variety of models over the next 12 years, including several performance models like the Ford Escort Cosworth, the RS200 and others. He also spent a spell at Aston Martin in the early 1990s whilst the company was under Ford ownership, overseeing the development and launch of the critically acclaimed DB7 model and switch from manufacturer of handbuilt-only vehicles at the traditional Newport Pagnell site to a higher-volume producer at a new factory operation at Bloxham.

Following this spell at Aston Martin, he returned to Ford in 1995, taking over as director of Service Engineering within the Customer Service Division, his time there being most noticeable for an early television appearance in a combative appearance opposite Anne Robinson on the BBC's Watchdog programme, robustly defending Ford's handling of a safety recall campaign for brake servo assist pumps in its diesel car range.

Fry joined Prodrive as managing director in January 2001, upon the persuasion of David Richards, where he has been responsible for leading Prodrive's expansion into outsourced engineering services. Within four months of his appointment, Prodrive Automotive Technology had a full order book for 2001 and major steps had been taken to grow the company in the UK and beyond with the acquisition of the Tickford Group. This expansion saw Fry become group managing director overseeing both the company's engineering and racing operations.

In January 2002, he was appointed managing director of BAR F1 in addition to his Prodrive responsibilities.

Fry achieved his first victory as a manager/chief executive of a Formula 1 team when Jenson Button took the chequered flag at the 2006 Hungarian Grand Prix.

On 15 June 2012 Fry received an Honorary Doctorate from Cranfield University in recognition of his services to motorsport.

In March 2013, Fry was replaced by Toto Wolff as the chief executive officer of the Mercedes AMG Petronas Motorsport F1 team.

In February 2018, Fry was appointed by professional esports organisation Fnatic as its new head of commercial strategy.

References

External links

 Profile - from Mercedes GP official website
 Profile - from Phil Huff, Sport Network

1956 births
Living people
Formula One team principals
Alumni of the University of Wales
British motorsport people
Honda people
Brawn GP